Nighat Sultana was a Pakistani actress. She acted in both Urdu and Punjabi films and is known for her roles in films Chann Mahi, Umar Marvi, Saat Lakh, Insaf, Insan Badalta Hay, Neend, Dil Mera Dharkan Teri, Afsana Zindagi Ka and Kabhi Alwida Na Kehna.

Early life
Hasan Ali her father was from a Bengali family and he worked in army and was sent to Iraq during the World War I there he married Iraqi Kurd woman. Nighat was born in 1935 in Khurdistan, Iraq. When Nighat was fourteen years her parents then left Iraq and went to settled in Pakistan at Karachi. 

Nighat's father wanted her to become a doctor. She studied nursing and became a nurse and worked in an army hospital before joining films. After sometime her father Hasan suffered from some blindness illness.

In 1953 Nighat went to Lahore and there she met director Aslam Irani and he cast her in his film Tarrap. In the film Tarrap she worked with Sudhir, Shammi and Allauddin.

Career
She made her debut as an actress in 1953. She worked in many Lollywood films. She appeared in films Pasban, Nooran, Teray Baghair, Insaf, Tamanna, Rahguzar and Mitti Dian Moortan. Then she changed her name to Nighat Sultana and later she appeared in films Pazeb, Koh-e-Noor, Afshan, Salgira, Jaisay Jantay Nahin and Afsana Zindagi Ka. In 1956, she played the leading role in the country's first Sindhi language film Umar Marvi. Since then she appeared in films Zanjeer, BeGunah, Sukh Ka Sapna, Lakhpati, Jan-e-Bahar and Shehbaz

Personal life
She married director Hassan Tariq after the film Neend but they first met on the set of film Saat Lakh where he was working as chief assistant director. She had two children with Hassan Tariq a son name Tahir Hassan and daughter Reena later Hassan divorced her and she took the custoday of her children.

Death
Nighat died at her home in Karachi in December 16th, 2002.

Filmography

Television

Film

References

External links
 

1935 births
20th-century Pakistani actresses
Actresses in Punjabi cinema
21st-century Pakistani actresses
Actresses in Urdu cinema
2002 deaths
Actresses in Sindhi cinema
Pakistani television actresses
Pakistani film actresses